Ray Williams Jones (April 5, 1855 – August 1, 1919) was the 16th Lieutenant Governor of Minnesota. Born in Remsen, New York, moved to Minnesota, and became Lieutenant governor under Governors Samuel Van Sant and John Albert Johnson from January 5, 1903, to January 5, 1907. Married Pauline B. Spitzley. He died in 1919 in Seattle, Washington.

Biography
Ray Williams Jones was born on 5 April 1855 in Remsen, Oneida County, New York, USA to John, R Jones (1822-1857), and Jennette Jones Jones (1823-1903). In 1879, he moved with his mother to Utica where he stayed until at least 1880, when he moved to Muskegon, Michigan, USA. During his time in Michigan,he worked as an accountant and later met his wife here.

References
Minnesota Historical Society

1855 births
1919 deaths
People from Remsen, New York
Lieutenant Governors of Minnesota
Minnesota Republicans
19th-century American politicians